Agha Bismil is an Indian Urdu poet.

Career
Agha Bismil's most popular ghazal is Mehfil Mein Baar Baar, which was made popular by Ghulam Ali.

References

Indian male poets
Urdu-language poets from India
Living people
Year of birth missing (living people)